The Paul Schmitt PS.10 was a prototype World War I French two-seat biplane bomber.

Development
The P.S.10 was a refinement of the previous P.S.7, fitted with a heavier armament and a more powerful  Renault 12Fe engine however the success of the Breguet 14 meant there was no official interest and none entered service.

Specifications (Paul Schmitt P.S.10)

See also

References

Citations

Bibliography

1910s French bomber aircraft
Biplanes
Military aircraft of World War I
Aircraft first flown in 1917
Paul Schmitt aircraft
Single-engined tractor aircraft